One Night Stud is a 2015 Chinese romantic comedy film directed by Li Xinman. It was released on February 6, 2015. This movie was also partly filmed in Okinawa, Japan.

Cast
Jiang Yiyan
Ryan Cheng
Yu Xiao
Yu Jiameng
Chang Fangyuan
Johnson Chen
Liu Sha
Shi Chunling
Li Changlin
Tan Shasha
Hasi Gaowa
Wang Yingran

Reception
By February 6, the film had earned  at the Chinese box office.

References

2015 romantic comedy films
Chinese romantic comedy films
2010s Mandarin-language films